Christianity is a minority in the Chinese province of Sichuan (formerly romanized as Szechwan or Szechuan; also referred to as "West China" or "Western China"). Eastern Lipo, Kadu people and A-Hmao are ethnic groups present in the province.

History

East Syriac Christianity 

A presence of the East Syriac Christianity can be confirmed in Chengdu during the Tang dynasty (618–907), and two monasteries have been located in Chengdu and Mount Emei. A report by the Tang-dynasty writer Li Deyu included in the  states that a certain Daqin cleric proficient in optometry was present in the Chengdu area.

It was later destroyed by the Great Fire of  during the reign of Emperor Wu of Han (141 BC – 87 BC).

The name Bakos, of a priest from Chongqing, is recorded on the left side, second row, at the very top of the "Nestorian" Xi'an Stele. A pilgrim cross and several crosses of Syrian design were identified by a Syriac Orthodox priest Dale Albert Johnson in Ciqikou, Chongqing, dated to the 9th century. The pilgrim cross embedded in a stone on Ciqikou street has a simple style as the type carved by pilgrims and travelers. Of the Syrian-designed crosses, one was found on the same street as the pilgrim cross, is fundamentally identical to crosses found in Aleppo, Syria. The icon consists of a cross within a circle touching eight points. Two points on each end of the four ends of the cross touch the inner arch of the circle. Each arm of the cross is narrower near the middle than at the ends. The center of the cross draws to a circle at the center. The rest are crosses within Bodhi leaves carved on a round granite stone base sitting in front of a curio shop on a side street in Ciqikou. According to Johnson, crosses within Bodhi leaves (heart shape or spade designs) are identified as Persian crosses associated with the Syrian Christians of India.

Roman Catholicism 

The first Roman Catholic mission in Sichuan was carried out by Gabriel de Magalhães and Lodovico Buglio, during the 1640s. They found a considerable number of converts in Paoning, Candida then invited the priest Claudius Motel to serve the congregation. Several churches were built in Chengdu, Paoning and Chongqing under the supervision of Motel.

The predecessor of the Roman Catholic Diocese of Chengdu —the Apostolic Vicariate of Setchuen (Sichuan)— was established on 15 October 1696, and Artus de Lionne, a French missionary, was the first apostolic vicar. In 1753, the Paris Foreign Missions Society took over responsibility for Catholic mission in Sichuan. In 1803, the first synod ever celebrated in China took place in Chongqingzhou, convened by Louis Gabriel Taurin Dufresse. By 1804, the Sichuanese Catholic community included four French missionaries and eighteen local priests. By 1870, the Church in Sichuan had 80,000 faithful, which was the largest number of Catholics in the entire country.

The first group of Spanish Redemptorists left for China in February 1928: Segundo Miguel Rodríguez, José Morán Pan and Segundo Velasco Arina. They were active in the Apostolic Vicariate of Chengdu and the Apostolic Vicariate of Ningyuanfu in Xichang, and had a house and chapel built in Chengdu. The last Spanish Redemptorists were expelled from China by the communist government in 1952.

The  was established in 1984 in Chengdu. In 2000, Lucy Yi Zhenmei, a 19th-century virgin martyr from Mianyang, was canonised a saint by Pope John Paul II. Today, the Catholic population of the province is estimated at 250,000 persons.

Protestantism 

In 1868, Griffith John of London Missionary Society and Alexander Wylie of British and Foreign Bible Society entered Sichuan as the first Protestant missionaries to take up work in that province. They travelled throughout Sichuan, reported the situation along the way to the headquarters of various missionary societies in Britain and missionaries in China, which opened the door for the entry of Protestantism into Sichuan.

However, no other missionaries visited this province again until 1877, when Rev. John McCarthy of the China Inland Mission (CIM), after landing at Wanhsien, travelled via Shuenkingfu to Chungking, where he arrived on 1 May. There he rented premises for other CIM missionaries to use as a base.

In 1882, American Methodist Episcopal missionaries arrived in Chungking. Their early efforts encountered strong resistance and riots that led to the abandonment of the mission. It was not until 1889 that these Methodists came back and started the mission again.

The year 1887 marks the arrival of the Anglican representatives of the CIM. William Cassels, already in holy orders; Arthur T. Polhill-Turner, was reading for orders when he volunteered for China; and Montagu Proctor-Beauchamp. All three were members of the Cambridge Seven.

In 1888, the London Missionary Society began work in Sichuan, taking Chungking as their center, a city in the east of the province. In addition, they had a large district to the south and southeast.

The first American Baptist missionaries to reach the province were Rev. W. M. Upcraft and Rev. George Warner, who sailed in 1889. The journey required many weeks before their arrival in Suifu, where they established the first mission station. Four more stations were established in Kiatingfu (1894), Yachowfu (1894), Ningyuanfu (1905), and Chengtu (1909).

Robert John and Mary Jane Davidson of Friends' Foreign Mission Association introduced Quakerism into Tungchwan in 1889. Within 19 years five monthly meetings were successively established in Chengtu, Chungking, Tungchwan, Tungliang and Suining.

At the close of 1891, the Rev. James Heywood Horsburgh, along with Mrs. Horsburgh, Rev. O. M. Jackson, three laymen, and six single women missionaries, entered Sichuan as the first band of Church Missionary Society (CMS) missionaries to take up work in that province. By 1894, CMS work had started in Mienchow, Chungpa, Anhsien, Mienchu and Sintu. Their first church was founded in 1894 in Chungpa.

In 1892, the Canadian Methodist Mission established missionary stations in Chengdu and Leshan. In 1910, the Canadian Mission took over Chungking district from London Missionary Society.

The Anglican Diocese of Szechwan was established in 1895, under the supervision of the Church of England. The foundation of the diocese was the result from the efforts of William Cassels, Arthur T. Polhill-Turner and Montagu Proctor-Beauchamp. Cassels was consecrated as the first diocesan bishop in Westminster Abbey, in the same year.

In 1897, Cecil Polhill, also one of the Cambridge Seven, along with other four China Inland Mission missionaries, they established a missionary station in Tatsienlu, west of Sichuan, which paved the way for the future construction of the Gospel Church.

The West China Union University was launched in 1910, in Chengdu. It was the product of a collective effort of four Protestant missionary boards: American Baptist Foreign Mission Society (American Baptist Churches USA), American Methodist Episcopal Mission (Methodist Episcopal Church), Friends' Foreign Mission Association (British Quakers) and Canadian Methodist Mission (Methodist Church of Canada). The Church Missionary Society (Church of England) became a partner in the university in 1918.

In 1914, the Adventist Mission established a mission station in Chongqing. Their Sichuan Mission was officially formed in 1917. In 1919, the mission was divided into East Sichuan Mission and West Sichuan Mission for easier administration.

By 1922, the Foreign Christian Missionary Society had its center at Batang. Due to the constitution of Sichuan at the time, Batang fell outside the western boundary and belonged to the special territory of Chuanbian.

Lutheranism also had a small presence in Chongqing, which was part of east Sichuan.

In 1940, the Church of Christ in China established the first mission station in Lixian, a county lies in the Sichuan-Khams Tibetan border region, as part of their Border Service Movement. This movement had a marked character of Social Gospel, with the aim of spreading Christianity to the Tibetan, Qiang and Yi peoples.

In 1950 it was estimated there were more than 50,000 Protestants in Sichuan, meeting in hundreds of churches and chapels. Today, the number of Protestants exceeds 200,000, many Christians are in rural areas. Panzhihua was an area of rapid growth of Christianity in around 2000 AD. A Sichuan Theological College exists.

Current situation 
After the communist takeover of China in 1949, Protestant Churches in China were forced to sever their ties with respective overseas Churches, which has thus led to the merging of all the denominations into communist-sanctioned Three-Self Patriotic Church. As for the Catholic Church in China, all legal worship has to be conducted in government-approved churches belonging to the Catholic Patriotic Association, which does not accept the primacy of the Roman pontiff. Some missionaries were arrested and sent to "thought reform centers" in which they underwent disturbing re-education process in a vindictive prison setting.

On 20 June 2009, the police in Langzhong set free 18 house church leaders arrested on 9 June. In 2018, Wang Yi, a well-known pastor from Chengdu, along with 100 Christians, were detained by authorities. Wang was reportedly arrested on allegations of "inciting subversion of state power". That same year, four Christian churches in Sichuan have been given an ultimatum and told they must join the Three-Self Church or be shut down. In 2019, 200 congregants in Chengdu began to meet in secret after their state registered Three-Self church has been shut down. On 14 August 2022, police in Chengdu raided a Sunday gathering of the Early Rain Covenant Church and detained a leader.

Maps

See also 

 An Account of the Entry of the Catholic Religion into Sichuan
 Anti-Christian Movement (China)
 Anti-missionary riots in China
 Cathedral of St Joseph, Chongqing
 Chinese Rites controversy
 Denunciation Movement
 Underground church
 :Category:Catholic Church in Sichuan
 :Category:Protestantism in Sichuan
 Christianity in Sichuan's neighbouring provinces
 Christianity in Guizhou
 Christianity in Qinghai
 Christianity in Shaanxi
 Christianity in Tibet

References

Bibliography 
 
 
 
 
 
 
 
 

 

Sichuan